Quillón is a Chilean city and commune and Diguillín Province, Ñuble Region.

Demographics
Of these, 7,536 (49.8%) lived in urban areas and 7,610 (50.2%) in rural areas. The population grew by 4% (584 persons) between the 1992 and 2002 censuses.

Administration
As a commune, Quillón is a third-level administrative division of Chile administered by a municipal council, headed by an alcalde who is directly elected every four years. The 2008–2012 alcalde is Jaime Catalán Saldias (PDC).

Within the electoral divisions of Chile, Quillón is represented in the Chamber of Deputies by Jorge Sabag (PDC) and Frank Sauerbaum (RN) as part of the 42nd electoral district, (together with San Fabián, Ñiquén, San Carlos, San Nicolás, Ninhue, Quirihue, Cobquecura, Treguaco, Portezuelo, Coelemu, Ránquil, Bulnes, Cabrero and Yumbel). The commune is represented in the Senate by Alejandro Navarro Brain (MAS) and Hosain Sabag Castillo (PDC) as part of the 12th senatorial constituency (Biobío-Cordillera).

Temperature record

References

Communes of Chile
Populated places in Diguillín Province